The 2004 Women's Athens International Hockey Tournament was a women's field hockey tournament, consisting of a series of test matches. It was held in Athens, Greece, from 4 to 8 February 2008. The tournament served as a test event for the field hockey tournament at the 2004 Summer Olympics. The tournament featured four of the top nations in women's field hockey.

South Africa won the tournament after defeating Spain 1–0 in the final. Australia finished in third place after defeating Great Britain 2–0 in the third place playoff.

Competition format
The tournament featured the national teams of Australia, Great Britain, South Africa and Spain, competing in a round-robin format, with each team playing each other once. Three points were awarded for a win, one for a draw, and none for a loss.

* includes results representing England, Scotland and Wales.

Results
All times are local (EET).

Preliminary round

Pool

Fixtures

Classification round

Third and fourth place

Final

Statistics

Final standings

Goalscorers

References

2004 in women's field hockey
2004 in Greek sport
Sports competitions in Athens
Women's international field hockey competitions in Europe